is a Japanese voice actress who works for Theatrical Group EN.

Filmography

Television animation
Strange Dawn (2000) (Mani)
Demon Lord Dante (2002) (Saeko Kodai/Medusa)
Princess Tutu (2002) (Ebine)
Air Master (2003) (Sampaguita Kai)
Hikaru no Go (2003) (Tamako-sensei, Tetsuo Kaga (child))
Monster (2004) (Antonin)
Tetsujin 28-go (2004) (Takamizawa)
Claymore (2007) (Undine)
Shangri-La (2009) (Sayoko)
Keep Your Hands Off Eizouken! (2020) (Asakusa's mother)

Theatrical animation
Gundress (1999) (Arisa Takakura)

Dubbing

Live-action
Drew Barrymore
Charlie's Angels (2003 TV Asahi edition) (Dylan Sanders)
Donnie Darko (Karen Pomeroy)
Confessions of a Dangerous Mind (Penny Pacino)
Charlie's Angels: Full Throttle (2006 TV Asahi edition) (Dylan Sanders)
Music and Lyrics (Sophie Fisher)
He's Just Not That Into You (Mary Harris)
Big Miracle (Rachel Kramer)
Miss You Already (Jess)
10 Things I Hate About You (Bianca Stratford (Larisa Oleynik))
The Adventures of Rocky and Bullwinkle (Karen Sympathy (Piper Perabo))
The Adventures of Swiss Family Robinson (1998 TV) (Emily Chen)
The Adventurers (Red Ye (Shu Qi))
All the Pretty Horses (Alejandra Villarreal (Penélope Cruz))
American Pie (Vicki Lathum (Tara Reid))
American Pie 2 (Vicki Lathum (Tara Reid))
American Reunion (Vicki Lathum (Tara Reid))
Armageddon (2002 Fuji TV edition) (Grace Stamper (Liv Tyler))
Batman & Robin (2000 TV Asahi edition) (Barbara Wilson (Alicia Silverstone))
Bedazzled (Alison Gardner / Nicole Delarusso (Frances O'Connor))
The Big Lebowski (Blu-Ray edition) (Bunny Lebowski (Tara Reid))
The Bone Collector (2002 TV Asahi edition) (Amelia Donaghy (Angelina Jolie))
Boys Don't Cry (Lana Tisdel (Chloë Sevigny))
Bring It On (Torrance Shipman (Kirsten Dunst))
Bubble Boy (Chloe (Marley Shelton))
Case 39 (Emily Jenkins (Renée Zellweger))
Dae Jang Geum (Yun Yeong-roh)
Dark Angel (TV version dub) (Cindy (Valarie Rae Miller))
Dark City (Emma Murdoch (Jennifer Connelly))
Devil's Knot (Pamela Hobbs (Reese Witherspoon))
Ghostbusters (Jennifer Lynch (Cecily Strong))
Go (Claire Montgomery (Katie Holmes))
Godmothered (Eleanor (Jillian Bell))
Gone Baby Gone (Angie Gennaro (Michelle Monaghan))
The Great Gatsby (Daisy Buchanan (Mia Farrow))
Grey's Anatomy (Dr. Isobel "Izzie" Stevens (Katherine Heigl))
Harsh Realm (Sophie Green (Samantha Mathis))
Hitch (Casey Sedgewick (Julie Ann Emery))
Just like Heaven (Abby Brody (Dina Spybey))
Kate & Leopold (Kate McKay (Meg Ryan))
Killers (Jen Kornfeldt (Katherine Heigl))
Life as We Know It (Holly Berenson (Katherine Heigl))
Meet Dave (Number 3 (Gabrielle Union))
A Midsummer Night's Dream (Helena (Calista Flockhart))
Mission: Impossible 2 (Nyah Nordoff-Hall (Thandie Newton))
Models Inc. (Sarah Owens (Cassidy Rae))
Mojin: The Lost Legend (Shirley Yang (Shu Qi))
Monsoon Wedding (Aditi (Vasundhara Das))
The Mummy (Evelyn Carnahan (Rachel Weisz))
The Mummy Returns (Evelyn Carnahan-O'Connel (Rachel Weisz))
My Blueberry Nights (Sue Lynne Copeland (Rachel Weisz))
Nanny McPhee and the Big Bang (Isabel Green (Maggie Gyllenhaal))
Ouija: Origin of Evil (Alice Zander (Elizabeth Reaser))
Paddington 2 (Mary Brown (Sally Hawkins))
Rumor Has It (Sarah Huttinger (Jennifer Aniston))
Sabrina the Teenage Witch (Sabrina Spellman (Melissa Joan Hart))
A Scanner Darkly (Donna Hawthorne (Winona Ryder))
Scarface (2004 DVD edition) (Elvira (Michelle Pfeiffer))
Shallow Hal (Jill (Susan Ward))
Sherlock (Mary Morstan (Amanda Abbington))
Sonic the Hedgehog (Longclaw)
Sonic the Hedgehog 2 (Longclaw)
Stargate Atlantis (Teyla Emmagan (Rachel Luttrell))
Suddenly Susan (Susan Keene (Brooke Shields))
Suits (Samantha Wheeler (Katherine Heigl))
Star Trek: Deep Space Nine (Ezri Dax (Nicole de Boer))
Torchwood (Gwen Cooper (Eve Myles))
The Tuxedo (Delilah "Del" Blaine (Jennifer Love Hewitt))
Van Helsing (Aleera (Elena Anaya))
The Waterboy (Vicki Vallencourt (Fairuza Balk))
The West Wing (Ellie Bartlet (Nina Siemaszko))
Winter Sonata (Chong-a)
Wolfe (Dot (Amanda Abbington))
Younger (Maggie Amato (Debi Mazar))

Animation
Isle of Dogs (Assistant Scientist Yoko Ono)

References

External links
 
Rie Ishizuka at Ryu's Seiyuu Infos

Rie Ishizuka at Foreign Drama Database (Japanese)

1964 births
Living people
Voice actresses from Shizuoka Prefecture
Japanese voice actresses